Nibley is a village in the parish of Westerleigh, South Gloucestershire, England; it is situated about  west of Yate.
  
The village of North Nibley (also commonly known as Nibley) is some 10 miles (16 km) away to the north, and there is also a Nibley on the west bank of the Severn, near Lydney.

References

Villages in South Gloucestershire District